A rapid response team is a network of safe homes formed to hide and shield undocumented aliens from deportation by U.S. immigration authorities, along with an effort by the ACLU to provide legal assistance to undocumented immigrants facing deportation by the U.S. Immigration and Customs Enforcement agency (ICE). It is a counter to the threats of mass deportations made by Donald Trump. While it is relatively easy for authorities to arrest undocumented immigrants in businesses and churches, since by federal law such places are considered to be public spaces, it is harder for authorities to enter a private home belonging to a legal citizen, since authorities need to obtain a warrant first before entering. The idea is to make it harder for authorities to find and arrest undocumented immigrants. Rapid response teams are more likely to be organized and led in sanctuary cities such as Los Angeles and Denver. Los Angeles-based pastor Ada Valiente hopes to establish a network of safe homes across southern California and elsewhere.

References 

Resistance movements